The 1987 All-Big Ten Conference football team consists of American football players chosen as All-Big Ten Conference players for the 1987 college football season.  The organizations selecting All-Big Ten teams in 1987 included the Associated Press (AP) and the United Press International (UPI).

The 1987 All-Big Ten teams were led by Michigan State tailback Lorenzo White and Indiana wide receiver Ernie Jones, who were selected as the Co-Big Ten Players of the Year. White led the conference with 16 touchdowns from scrimmage and finished second in the conference with 1,572 rushing yards.  Jones led the conference with 66 receptions and 1,265 receiving yards. Other individual award winners included Wisconsin quarterback Tony Lowery as the 1987 Big Ten Freshman of the Year.

First-team honorees by team
Michigan State (7).  The 1987 Michigan State Spartans football team was undefeated in conference play and won the conference championship.  In addition to Lorenzo White, six other Michigan State players earned first-team all-conference honors. The remaining honorees were offensive tackle Tony Mandarich, center Pat Shurmur, linebacker Percy Snow, defensive backs Todd Krumm and John Miller, and punter Greg Montgomery.  Mandarich was named the Big Ten Offensive Lineman of the Year, and head coach George Perles was selected by the conference coaches as the Big Ten Coach of the Year.

Iowa (6). The 1987 Iowa Hawkeyes team under head coach Hayden Fry finished in second place in the conference and placed six players on the first-team All-Big Ten teams. The Hawkeyes contingent was led by quarterback Chuck Hartlieb and who received first-team honors from the AP and UPI and led the conference with 2,855 passing yards, 19 passing touchdowns, and a 161.4 passing efficiency rating. The other Iowa honorees were tight end Marv Cook, receiver Quinn Early, defensive lineman Dave Haight, defensive back Kerry Burt and kicker Rob Houghtlin.  Haight was selected as the Big Ten Defensive Lineman of the Year.

Michigan (5). The 1987 Michigan team under head coach Bo Schembechler placed five players on the first team. The Michigan contingent was led by running back Jamie Morris led the conference with 1,703 rushing yards and 1,825 yards from scrimmage and received first-team honors from both the AP and UPI. The other Michigan first-team players were defensive tackle Mark Messner and offensive linemen Jumbo Elliott, John Vitale, and Mike Husar.

Ohio State (4).  The 1987 Ohio State team under head coach Earl Bruce placed four players on the All-Big Ten first team.  The Ohio State honorees were linebacker Chris Spielman, defensive lineman Eric Kumerow, defensive back William White, and punter Tom Tupa. Spielman was the only player unanimously selected by all of the voters on the AP media panel.

Indiana (3).  Three Indiana Hoosiers players were also recognized as first-team honorees.  In addition to Co-Big Ten Player of the Year Ernie Jones, the other two Indiana first-team players were linebacker Van Waiters and offensive guard Don Shrader.  Running back Anthony Thompson rushed for 1,014 yards and was selected as a second-team honoree by the UPI, and head coach Bill Mallory was selected by the conference media as the Big Ten Coach of the Year.

Offensive selections

Quarterbacks
 Chuck Hartlieb, Iowa (AP-1; UPI-1)
 Rickey Foggie, Minnesota (UPI-2)

Running backs
 Jamie Morris, Michigan (AP-1; UPI-1)
 Lorenzo White, Michigan State (AP-1; UPI-1)
 Anthony Thompson, Indiana (UPI-2)
 Darrell Thompson, Minnesota (UPI-2)

Centers
 John Vitale, Michigan (AP-1; UPI-2)
 Pat Shurmur, Michigan State (UPI-1)

Guards
 Troy Wolkow, Minnesota (AP-1; UPI-1)
 Mike Husar, Michigan (AP-1; UPI-2)
 Don Shrader, Indiana (UPI-1)
 Paul Anderson, Minnesota (UPI-2)

Tackles
 Tony Mandarich, Michigan State (AP-1; UPI-1)
 Paul Gruber, Wisconsin (AP-1; UPI-2)
 Jumbo Elliott, Michigan (UPI-1)
 Eric Moore, Indiana (UPI-2)

Tight ends
 Marv Cook, Iowa (AP-1; UPI-1)
 Anthony Williams, Illinois (UPI-2)

Receivers
 Quinn Early, Iowa (AP-1; UPI-1)
 Ernie Jones, Indiana (AP-1; UPI-1)
 Anthony Hardy, Purdue (UPI-2)
 Andre Rison, Michigan State (UPI-2)

Defensive selections

Linemen-outside linebackers
 Dave Haight, Iowa (AP-1; UPI-1)
 Mark Messner, Michigan (AP-1; UPI-1)
 Eric Kumerow, Ohio State (AP-1; UPI-1)
 Scott Davis, Illinois (UPI-1)
 Travis Davis, Michigan State (UPI-2)
 Moe Gardner, Illinois (UPI-2)
 Mark Nichols, Michigan State (UPI-2)
 Mike Piel, Illinois (UPI-2)

Linebackers
 Chris Spielman, Ohio State (AP-1; UPI-1)
 Fred Strickland, Purdue (AP-1; UPI-1)
 Van Waiters, Indiana (AP-1; UPI-1)
 Jon Leverenz, Minnesota (AP-1; UPI-2)
 Percy Snow, Michigan State (AP-1; UPI-2)
 Tim Moore, Michigan State (UPI-2)

Defensive backs
 Todd Krumm, Michigan State (AP-1; UPI-1)
 William White, Ohio State (AP-1; UPI-1)
 Kerry Burt, Iowa (AP-1; UPI-2)
 Marc Foster, Purdue (UPI-1)
 John Miller, Michigan State (UPI-1)
 Dwight Sistrunk, Iowa (UPI-2)
 Doug Mallory, Michigan (UPI-2)
 Bobby Dawson, Illinois (UPI-2)

Special teams

Kickers
 Rob Houghtlin, Iowa (AP-1; UPI-1)
 Chip Lohmiller, Minnesota (UPI-2)

Punters
 Tom Tupa, Ohio State (AP-1; UPI-2)
 Greg Montgomery, Michigan State (UPI-1)

Key
AP = Associated Press

UPI = United Press International

Bold = Consensus first-team selection of both the AP and UPI

See also
 1987 College Football All-America Team
 1987 Michigan State Spartans football team
 Big Ten Conference football individual awards

References

All-Big Ten Conference
All-Big Ten Conference football teams